Geraltov is a village and municipality in Prešov District in the Prešov Region of eastern Slovakia.

History
In historical records the village was first mentioned in 1339.

Geography

Population 
It has a population of about 121 people (2020-12-31).

Genealogical resources
The records for genealogical research are available at the state archive "Statny Archiv in Presov, Slovakia"
 Roman Catholic church records (births/marriages/deaths):1717-1896 (parish B)
 Greek Catholic church records (births/marriages/deaths): 1800-1895 (parish A)

See also
 List of municipalities and towns in Slovakia

References

External links
 
 
https://web.archive.org/web/20080111223415/http://www.statistics.sk/mosmis/eng/run.html
Surnames of living people in Geraltov

Villages and municipalities in Prešov District
Šariš

hu:Csergőzávod